El Rompido is a coastal borough in the municipality of Cartaya which is situated in the province of Huelva in Andalusia, Spain. El Rompido was founded sometime in the 16th century. El Rompido is situated in the mouth of the Río Piedras. It has 1,832 inhabitants and is 8 kilometres away from Cartaya which connects to El Rompido via Carretera Forestal de las Cumbres.

History

Evidence of human settlement in El Rompido dates back to the paleolithic era who inhabited the area around the mouth of the Río Piedras. In 1971, 208 pieces of quartzite thought to date back to the third to ninth millennium were discovered in El Rompido. There are indications that the area was used as a fishing settlement in the Roman era, something the local economy has relied on for decades upon decades until the influx of tourists. Despite this, evidence of settlements in El Rompido during the Islamic presence in Spain from 711 until 1614 have not been found. Tourism, now one of El Rompido's main industries, has slowly been building in the village since the 1960s and there has been a sharp upturn in tourism in the last decade.

Other information
El Rompido is home to Marismas del Río y La Flecha del Rompido Natural Area, a reserve in the Río Piedras marshlands given protective status in 1989. The reserve is home to a variety of flora and fauna. In El Rompido there are a number of hotels, a town centre and two golf courses. Situated in Andalucía, neighbouring towns include Cartaya, Lepe, Punta Umbría and Ayamonte. The economy also used to rely on fishing as it is on the coast, next to a spit named Flecha del Rompido (English: Arrow of El Rompido) separated by the Río Piedras. Fishing was, for a long time, a key part of life in El Rompido with boats still docked on the beach today, used for catching flatfish and shrimp. Almadraba tuna fishing attracted many Portuguese workers and people alike. On the last weekend of July the village celebrates the festival of the Virgen del Carmen, a festival commonly celebrated in southern Spain. In the 1980s and 1990s the celebrations became so notorious in the Huelva area that upwards of 3,000 people would attend the festival. The figures seen back then have somewhat declined in the 2000s.

References

Populated places in the Province of Huelva